Hasselbach is a small river of Lower Saxony, Germany. It flows into the Dürre Holzminde near Holzminden.

See also
List of rivers of Lower Saxony

Rivers of Lower Saxony
Solling
Rivers of Germany